Amrta Suryananda Maha Raja is a Portugal-based Yoga guru, the president of the Yoga Portuguese Confederation and the founder of Yoga Sámkhya Institute, Portugal. Born in Portugal in 1952, he started learning the Indian tradition of Yoga in his twenties from Krshnánandaji of the Shivánanda Áshrama, located in Rishikesh in Himalayan valley. He is also known to have been influenced by Aurobindo, Vivekananda, Satyananda, Kuvalayananda and Ramakrishna Paramahamsa.

Amrta Suryananda is the author of two books on Yoga, Chakra Sútra – The 7 Main Chakra in Yoga and Sámkhya, Cosmo genesis and Yoga – Beyond Hydrogen. He is also reported to be writing an encyclopedia on yoga and is in the process of translating Yoga Sutra of Patanjali into Portuguese language. The Government of India honoured him in 2015 with the award of Padma Shri, the fourth highest Indian civilian award.

See also
 Patanjali

References

External links
 
 http://www.jagatguruamrtasuryananda.org/
 जगतगुरु स्वामी अमृत सूर्य जी महाराजा

Recipients of the Padma Shri in other fields
Living people
Indian diaspora in Europe
Portuguese non-fiction writers
Indian yoga teachers
1952 births